Galate is a village in the municipality of Vrapčište, North Macedonia.

Demographics
As of the 2021 census, Galate had 980 residents with the following ethnic composition:
Albanians 461
Macedonians 296
Turks 214
Persons for whom data are taken from administrative sources 6
Others 3

According to the 2002 census, the village had a total of 1151 inhabitants. Ethnic groups in the village include:

Albanians 643
Macedonians 334
Turks 173
Serbs 1

References

External links

Villages in Vrapčište Municipality
Albanian communities in North Macedonia